

References

        

Chemical data pages
Chemical data pages cleanup